The deep perineal pouch (also deep perineal space) is the anatomic space enclosed in part by the perineum, and located superior to the perineal membrane.

Structure
The deep perineal pouch is bordered inferiorly by the perineal membrane, also known as the inferior fascia of the urogenital diaphragm.  It is bordered superiorly by the superior fascia of the urogenital diaphragm. The deep pouch is now described as the region between the perineal membrane and the pelvic diaphragm.

Contents
The deep perineal pouch contains:
 muscles
Deep transverse perineal muscles
External sphincter muscle of male urethra
External sphincter muscle of female urethra
Compressor urethrae muscle in the female is sometimes included
Urethrovaginal sphincter in the female is sometimes included
 other
 Membranous urethra in the male; proximal portion of urethra in the female
 Bulbourethral gland (males). The Bartholin gland, the female counterpart is in the superficial perineal pouch
 Vagina (females)

"Urogenital diaphragm"
Older texts have asserted the existence of a "urogenital diaphragm", which was described as a layer of the pelvis that separates the deep perineal sac from the upper pelvis. The deep perineal pouch lies between the inferior fascia of the urogenital diaphragm and superior fascia of the urogenital diaphragm.

Additional images

See also
 Superficial perineal pouch
 Urogenital diaphragm
 Pelvic floor
 Perineum

References

External links
  – "The Female Perineum: The Perineal Nerve"
  – "The Female Perineum – The Deep Perineal Pouch"
  – "The urinary bladder and the urethra as seen in a frontal section of the female pelvis."
  – "The Male Pelvis: The Prostate Gland"
 
 
 http://www.instantanatomy.net/abdomen/areas/perineum/mdeepperinealpouch.html

Perineum